Sant'Eugenio  is a titular church in Rome, Italy, dedicated to Pope Eugene I (r. AD 654–657).

History
The first church here was built in a style imitating and updating the Baroque, sometimes called 'Mussolini Baroque'.  The church was established by Pope Pius XII, in honor of his patron saint (his baptismal name was Eugenio Pacelli), and was funded by gifts he received on the Silver Jubilee of his episcopate in 1942. He consecrated its altar in 1951.

A residence college for young men studying for the priesthood at the Roman universities is annexed to the church.

The frescoes inside include The Triumph of the Cross above the altar (which includes an image of Pius), and others in the chapels of Our Lady of Fatima and of Saints Peter and Paul.

The church is being staffed by the Prelature of Opus Dei. The church is also regarded as a parish of the Prelature of Opus Dei.

Deaconry
The church of S. Eugenio was established as a Deaconry for a Cardinal Deacon by Pope John XXIII on 12 March 1960.  The following have been Cardinal Deacons of S. Eugenio:
 Antonio Bacci (31 Mar 1960 – 20 Jan 1971)
 Umberto Mozzoni  (5 Mar 1973 – 7 Nov 1983)
 Paul Joseph Jean Poupard (25 May 1985 – 29 Jan 1996).  Appointed, Cardinal-Priest of Santa Prassede.
 Francesco Colasuonno  (21 Feb 1998 – 31 May 2003)
 Julián Herranz Casado (21 Oct 2003 → )

References

Bibliography
 Martin Bräuer,  Handbuch der Kardinäle: 1846-2012 (Berlin/Boston: Walter de Gruyter GmbH & Co KG, 2014).

External links
 Opus Dei, US: Recent News  March 8, 2004, Cardinals Tauran and Herranz installed at their titular churches.  Retrieved: 2016-03-16.

12th-century Roman Catholic church buildings in Italy
1951 establishments in Italy
Basilica churches in Rome
Titular churches
Christian organizations established in 1951
Opus Dei
Rome Q. III Pinciano